WFNQ (106.3 FM; "Frank FM") is a radio station in Nashua, New Hampshire, serving the Manchester area with a classic hits radio format.  It is owned by Binnie Media.  The station's studios are located on Church Street in Concord, and its transmitter is located in Merrimack, just west of the Merrimack Premium Outlets.

WFNQ can also be received in the northern portion of the Boston media market.  The station has FM co-channel interference with Providence-market WWKX past this area.

WFNQ is the flagship station of a three-station network under the Frank FM branding. 98.3 WLNH-FM in Laconia (serving the Lakes Region) and 98.7 WBYY in Somersworth (serving the Seacoast Region) share WFNQ's playlist and branding, but have separate commercials. Additionally, 99.1 WNNH previously served as a full simulcast of WFNQ for areas north and west of Manchester; it is now an active rock station.

History

WFNQ signed on October 19, 1987, as WHOB, under the ownership of Mario DiCarlo.  Although WHOB was a new license, it inherited the allocation previously assigned to WOTW-FM, which operated from 1947 until 1985.  At one time a CHR station, the station began mixing in modern rock in 1996, and had shifted to hot adult contemporary by 1999, when DiCarlo retired and sold WHOB to Tele-Media.

Tele-Media sold WHOB, along with WNNH in Henniker and WLKZ in Wolfeboro, to Nassau Broadcasting Partners in 2004.  Nassau dropped the hot AC format in favor of the "Frank FM" classic hits format (the second Nassau station, after WFNK in Lewiston, Maine, to do so) and the WFNQ callsign on March 17, 2005. The station, along with 16 other Nassau stations in northern New England, was purchased at bankruptcy auction by WBIN Media Company, a company controlled by Bill Binnie, on May 22, 2012. Binnie already owned WBIN-TV in Derry and WYCN-LP in Nashua. The deal was completed on November 30, 2012.

On June 1, 2015, WFNQ shifted its format to classic rock. It switched back to classic hits in 2018.

On April 1, 2019, WNNH in Henniker began simulcasting WFNQ, bringing the station's programming to areas north and west of Manchester, including Concord. On May 24, 2019, WLNH-FM in Laconia and WBYY in Somersworth began carrying WFNQ's programming, but with separate advertising, forming a regional network. The "Frank FM" network transitioned to a hot adult contemporary format during 2021; during this transition, on September 3, 2021, WNNH left the network and launched its own active rock format.

After morning host Marc Nazzaro (who used the air name "DJ Nazzy") was laid off from "Frank FM" in January 2023 as part of a refocus of Binnie Media's resources on its news and talk programming, vice president of programming Heath Cole told the Concord Monitor that "the music format that we do will change." On February 1, 2023, WFNQ, along with the rest of the "Frank FM" network, again returned to a classic hits format; the stations also dropped their remaining on-air staff, who were reassigned to other positions within the company.

References

External links

FNQ
Classic hits radio stations in the United States
Nashua, New Hampshire
Hillsborough County, New Hampshire
Radio stations established in 1987
1987 establishments in New Hampshire